Headroom is the twelfth studio album by American singer-songwriter Don McLean, released in 1991.

Track listing
All songs written by Don McLean.
"Headroom"
"Fashion Victim"
"1967"
"Infinity"
"One in a Row"
"You Who Love the Truth"
"Lady in Waiting"
"Have You Seen Me"
"Siamese Twins (Joined at the Heart)"
"A Brand New World"

References

Don McLean albums
1990 albums
Curb Records albums